GYKI 52466 is a 2,3-benzodiazepine that acts as an ionotropic glutamate receptor antagonist, which is a non-competitive AMPA receptor antagonist (IC50 values are 10-20, ~ 450 and >> 50 μM for AMPA-, kainate- and NMDA-induced responses respectively), orally-active anticonvulsant, and skeletal muscle relaxant. Unlike conventional 1,4-benzodiazepines, GYKI 52466 and related 2,3-benzodiazepines do not act on GABAA receptors. Like other AMPA receptor antagonists, GYKI 52466 has anticonvulsant and neuroprotective properties.

See also
GYKI 52895, another 2,3-benzodiazepine with other than GABAergic function
Tifluadom
Lufuradom

References

AMPA receptor antagonists
Anticonvulsants
Muscle relaxants